Dildar, born Yûnis Reuf (20 February 1918 – October 20, 1948) was a Kurdish poet and political activist, best known for writing the Kurdish national anthem Ey Reqîb.

Early life and his studies 
Dildar was born on 20 February 1918 in the town of Koy Sanjaq located in the Mosul Vilayet of the Ottoman Empire. In his youth, he attended school in Ranya, high school in Kirkuk and moved to Baghdad to study law.

Life

Literary style 
Many of his poems were written in the classical Kurdish style with quantitative rhythm and monorhyme. His poems were published in the  Ronākī and  Galawēz literary journals in Erbil and Baghdad. He moreover introduced romantic and realistic elements in Kurdish poetry.

Law 
He graduated as a lawyer in 1945 and practiced law to defend the poor, farmers, and defending the Kurdish issues in general.

Political activism 
He joined the newly formed Hîwa Party in 1938, which became "[t]he first Kurdish organisation legally recognized, that seeks a united and free Kurdistan". Dildar relocated to Iranian Kurdistan to join the revolution led by Qazi Muhammad against the government of Iran, which led to his infamous arrest in Iran.

Prison and death

Ey Reqîb 
After being arrested, he was sent to prison in Iran, where he wrote the poem "Ey reqîb" meaning "Oh Enemy", in 1938, referencing the prison guards, and expressing that the Kurds were alive and will not back down from fighting for free a Kurdistan. His expression of frustration and direct confrontation with the occupiers of Kurdistan made "Ey reqib" a symbol in the Kurds cause for freedom.

Death and legacy 
Dildar died young at the age of 3‌0 and was buried in Erbil.

He lived to see his poem "Ey Reqîb" being adopted as the Kurdish national anthem. Ey Reqîb was first played and sung in 1946 on the proclamation of the short-lived Republic of Mahabad. Today the song is played as the official anthem of Kurdistan Region and widely adopted by Kurds in the four parts of Kurdistan.

Notes

Further reading 

Kurdish-language poets
Kurdish people
1918 births
1948 deaths
Iraqi Kurdish poets
People from Koy Sanjaq
20th-century Iraqi poets
Kurdish nationalists